KRKR (95.1 FM) is a radio station licensed to Waverly, Nebraska, United States. The station serves the Lincoln and West Omaha areas. Its transmitter is located near Davey.

KRKR is rebroadcast on La Vista translator 92.7 K224DJ to better serve the Omaha Metro area. KRKR is simulcast with KROA in Grand Island except for local information/weather inserts for the Lincoln/Omaha area, and evening programming.

History
The station went on the air as KXSS on July 1, 1983.  On June 15, 1985, the station changed its call sign to KJUS; on March 1, 1987, to KLDZ; on March 29, 1996, to KNET-FM; and on March 18, 1998, to the current KRKR.

In popular culture
The station "KRKR-TV" is seen in the 1958 film Attack of the 50 Foot Woman.

References

External links

RKR
Radio stations established in 1983
1983 establishments in Nebraska